Songs for Slim is an EP by the band The Replacements. The EP was recorded and sold to benefit former bandmate Slim Dunlap, who had suffered a stroke.  Chris Mars, former drummer for The Replacements, contributed to one song ("Radio Hook Word Hit") and designed the album art.

Track listing

Personnel
The Replacements
Paul Westerberg – vocals, guitar, piano, tambourine
Tommy Stinson – bass guitar, backing vocals
Chris Mars – vocals, guitar, bass, drums (on "Radio Hook Word Hit")
Kevin Bowe – guitar, backing vocals
Peter Anderson – drums
Technical
Ed Ackerson – producer

References

The Replacements (band) EPs
2013 EPs
New West Records albums
Charity albums